is a private junior college in the city of Kagoshima in Japan. It was established in 1960, and has been attached to Kagoshima Immaculate Heart University since 1994.

Departments
 Department of home economics
 Department of English studies

See also
 List of junior colleges in Japan

External links
 

Japanese junior colleges
Universities and colleges in Kagoshima Prefecture